Jill McCalla Vickers  (born 1942) is a Canadian feminist political scientist and retired emeritus professor at Carleton University in Ottawa, Ontario, Canada.  Vickers is particularly notable for her work in the field of gender in politics.

Personal
Vickers was born in Britain during the Second World War in 1942, to an English mother and a father who was a Canadian serviceman posted in England.  After the war she and her war-bride mother followed her father to Canada, where they resided in Hamilton, Ontario, until her parents' divorce.  Thereafter, she and he mother moved to Toronto, where she graduated from Harbord Collegiate.

She briefly attended Queen's University, transferring to Carleton University, where she graduated with a Bachelor of Arts degree in political science in 1965. She moved to London, England, where she studied at the London School of Economics, eventually earning a Doctor of Philosophy in political philosophy. She has been a professor at Carleton since 1971.

She was married to the Carleton history professor Keith Johnson until his death in 2018.

Politics
Vickers is a self-described socialist and long-time activist and supporter of the New Democratic Party. She ran for a seat in the House of Commons of Canada, during the 1979 federal election as the candidate for the NDP for the riding of Ottawa—Carleton. She finished third, behind the Progressive Conservative incumbent Jean Pigott and the victorious Liberal candidate Jean-Luc Pépin.

In 1984, she took part in a well-publicized debate at the University of Toronto on the topic "Socialism or Capitalism: Which Is the Moral System?". Vickers and Gerald Caplan represented the side of socialism, against Objectivist philosophers John Ridpath and Leonard Peikoff.

Awards and recognitions
The Canadian Political Science Association has announced that the Jill Vickers Prize, will be awarded to the author of the best paper presented, in English or French, at the annual conference of the Canadian Political Science Association on the topic of gender and politics.

In 2003 Vickers was selected to be a Fellow of the Royal Society of Canada.  Vickers is also a Chancellor's Professor of Political Science at Carleton.

References

External links
Carleton University bio
Canadian Political Science Association - Jill Vickers Prize

1942 births
Alumni of the London School of Economics
Canadian anti-capitalists
Canadian feminists
Canadian people of English descent
Canadian socialists
Candidates in the 1979 Canadian federal election
Carleton University alumni
Academic staff of Carleton University
Fellows of the Royal Society of Canada
Living people
New Democratic Party candidates for the Canadian House of Commons
People from Ottawa
Socialist feminists
Socialist politicians
Presidents of the Canadian Political Science Association